The Ammapettai block is a revenue block in the Papanasam taluk of the Thanjavur district in Tamil Nadu, India. It has a totally 46 panchayat villages.

List of Panchayat Villages

References 

 

Revenue blocks of Thanjavur district